Augie Tammariello is a former American football coach. He served as the head football coach at the University of Southwestern Louisiana—now known as the University of Louisiana at Lafayette—from 1974 to 1979, compiling a record of 30–35–2. A native of Pittsburgh, Tammariello played college football as a guard at the University of Denver. In 1962, he was hired as an assistant coach at the College of William & Mary, where he worked under head coaches Milt Drewer and Marv Levy. He moved to the University of Colorado Boulder in 1968 to serve as an assistant under head coach Eddie Crowder.

Since leaving college football in 1987, Tammariello has served as a insurance seller at a State Farm firm in Asheville, North Carolina.

Head coaching record

References

Year of birth missing (living people)
Living people
American football guards
Colorado Buffaloes football coaches
Denver Pioneers football players
Louisiana Ragin' Cajuns football coaches
Southeastern Louisiana Lions football coaches
William & Mary Tribe football coaches
Players of American football from Pittsburgh